Carl Edgar "Sailor" Howard (September 21, 1904 – 	February 12, 1980) was an American baseball pitcher in the Negro leagues. He played with the Brooklyn Eagles in 1935 and the New York Cubans in 1945.

References

External links
 and Seamheads

Brooklyn Eagles players
New York Cubans players
1904 births
1980 deaths
Baseball players from West Virginia
20th-century African-American sportspeople
Baseball pitchers